Manuela Viegas (born 13 October 1957) is a Portuguese film editor and director.   She is considered to be part of The School of Reis film tradition.

An influential film editor since the 1970s, she has edited dozens of films, among them Pedro Costa's Blood, Joaquim Sapinho's The Policewoman and João César Monteiro's Silvestre and À Flor do Mar.    In 1999, she directed her first and only feature film to date, Gloria, which was part of the official competition of the 49th Berlin International Film Festival, being the only Portuguese film to feature until Tabu was selected in 2012.

She is nowadays a professor of film editing at the Portuguese National Film School.

References

External links 
 

1957 births
Living people
People from Porto
Portuguese film directors
Film theorists
Portuguese women film directors
Women screenwriters

Women film editors